Shake! Otis at Monterey is a 1987 short film directed by D.A. Pennebaker documenting Otis Redding at the 1967 Monterey Pop Festival.

Redding's performance at the festival was cut short due to rain and an impending curfew. The 5 song set list, backed by Booker T. & the M.G.'s, included the songs "Shake", "Respect", "I’ve Been Loving You Too Long (To Stop Now)",  the Rolling Stones’ "(I Can't Get No) Satisfaction", and "Try a Little Tenderness".

References

External links

1987 films
Concert films
1980s short documentary films
Films directed by D. A. Pennebaker
American short documentary films
1980s English-language films
1980s American films